is a Japanese photographer.

He is a student of photographer Ōtsuji Kiyoji, and husband to Tokuko Ushioda.

External Links 
Artist website: http://www.catnet.ne.jp/usimaoda/

References

Japanese photographers
1948 births
Living people
People from Kobe